{{Infobox college softball team
|name = Penn State Nittany Lions softball
|CurrentSeason = 
|logo = Penn state wordmark.png
|logo_size = 200
|founded = 1965
|university = Pennsylvania State University
|conference = Big Ten Conference
|conference_short = Big Ten
|city = University Park
|stateabb = PA
|state = Pennsylvania
|coach =  Clarisa Crowell
|tenure = 1st
|stadium = Beard Field at Nittany Lion Softball Park
|capacity = 1,084
|nickname = Nittany Lions
|national_champion = 
|wcws = 
|wcws2 = 
|ncaa_tourneys = 1983, 1985, 2000, 2001, 2002, 2003, 2005, 2006, 2007, 2011
|conference_tournament = 
Atlantic 101983, 1985, 1988

Big Ten
|conference_champion = 
}}

The Penn State Nittany Lions softball''' team represents Pennsylvania State University in NCAA Division I college softball.  The team participates in the Big Ten Conference. The Nittany Lions are currently led by head coach Clarisa Crowell. The team plays its home games at Beard Field at Nittany Lion Softball Park located on the university's campus.

Coaching staff

Awards
Big Ten Coach of the Year
Robin Petrini, 1999

References